The Principality of Marlborough was a short-lived micronation established in 1993 located at  near Marlborough, Queensland, Australia, about  200 km (124 mi) north of Rockhampton.

The principality came into being when farmer George Muirhead, facing the possibility of the repossession of his properties - Kierawonga & Indicus - by the Commonwealth Bank, challenged the legality of their bills of exchange in the Queensland Supreme Court.  When he lost the case, Muirhead returned to his property under the grounds that he had been denied natural justice, and, along with his wife and approximately 30 other supporters, declared it to be an independent principality where the bank and Queensland Government had no legal authority.

Eleven days after the proclamation of independence (at approximately 5:00am), 120 officers of the Queensland Police entered the property and forcibly evicted the Muirheads.  The Muirheads won widespread media attention from across the world, with the media portraying them as hardworking people being victimized by a cold, heartless corporation. The Muirheads adopted the Australian flag, the Scottish Flag, the Australian Aboriginal Flag and the United Nations Flag as the symbol of their principality during the secession.

On the Queen's Birthday Long Weekend 1993, a small number of men, clad in surplus military fatigues, attempted to storm Parliament House in Canberra. When confronted by security officers, the group claimed to be the Marlborough Liberation Army. The group later turned out to be engaged in a high school prank.

As of 2004, the Muirheads have not pursued their claim to the principality.

References 

 "DIY Sovereignty and the Popular Right in Australia", by Judy Lattas, Macquarie University, March 2005.
 "Defiant Graziers Under Arrest", Sydney Morning Herald, 14 June 1993.
 "Rebel graziers' bid to keep land ends in contempt charge", Sydney Morning Herald, 14 June 1993.
 "Defiant graziers stay in jail", Sydney Morning Herald, 15 June 1993.
 "A Principality without walls near Jericho", Sydney Morning Herald, 15 June 1993.
 "The great conspiracy to enslave Australia", Sydney Morning Herald, 21 June 1993.
 Queensland Title Office records from 1993 for Kierawonga & Indicus.

Micronations in Australia
Politics of Queensland
States and territories established in 1993
Former unrecognized countries
Micronations